Albert William Sherer Jr. (January 19, 1916 – December 27, 1986) was an American diplomat.

Biography
In 1938 he received a B.A. from Yale University and an LL.B. in 1941 from Harvard University. He served in the U.S. Army Air Force from 1941 to 1945.

In 1946 to 1949 under the U.S. State Department, Sherer was a commercial officer in Tangier, Morocco and he was temporarily assigned to Casablanca, Morocco, as consular and legal officer from 1947 to 1948. After that in 1949 to 1951, he was political officer in Budapest, Hungary.

In 1951 from 1955, Sherer was the Romanian desk officer in the Office of Eastern European Affairs at the State Department. He was political officer in Prague, then Czechoslovakia, from 1955 to 1957 and an officer in charge of Polish, Baltic, and Czech Affairs in the office of Eastern European Affairs from 1957 to 1960.

From 1960 to 1961 he attended the Bowie Seminar for International Affairs at Harvard University. He was Deputy Chief of Mission in Warsaw, Poland, from 1961 to 1966, and appointed Ambassador to Togo from 1967 until 1970. In 1968 and 1969, he was also accredited as Ambassador to Equatorial Guinea. Sherer was also Ambassador to Guinea from 1970 to 1972, Ambassador to the Czechoslovakia from 1972 to 1975 and Chief of the U.S. delegation to CSCE from 1974 and 1975.

After ambassadorship, from 1975 to 1977, Sherer was Deputy Representative of the United States in the Security Council of the United Nations. In 1975 he served as Alternate U.S. Representative to the Seventh Special Session and the Thirtieth Session of the United Nations General Assembly, and in 1976 he served as Alternate U.S. Representative to the Thirty-first Session of the General Assembly. In 1977 he was Head of the U.S. delegation to the preparatory meeting in Belgrade, Serbia, of the CSCE.

His daughter Susan Sherer was married to journalist Peter Osnos. His grandson is journalist Evan Osnos.

References

External links
  Albert William Sherer, Jr. Papers (MS 1487). Manuscripts and Archives, Yale University Library.

Ambassadors of the United States to Guinea
Ambassadors of the United States to Togo
1986 deaths
1916 births
People from Wheaton, Illinois
Ambassadors of the United States to Czechoslovakia
Ambassadors of the United States to Equatorial Guinea
Harvard Law School alumni
Yale University alumni
United States Foreign Service personnel
20th-century American diplomats